An intensive pronoun (or self-intensifier) adds emphasis to a statement; for example, "I did it myself." While English intensive pronouns (e.g., myself, yourself, himself, herself, ourselves, yourselves, themselves) use the same form as reflexive pronouns, an intensive pronoun is different from a reflexive pronoun because it functions as an adverbial or adnominal modifier, not as an argument of a verb. Both intensive and reflexive pronouns make reference to an antecedent. For example, compare "I will do it myself," where "myself" is a self-intensifier indicating that nobody else did it, to "I sold myself," where "myself" fills the argument role of direct object. Note also that this sentence may be extended, as in "I sold myself myself," where the second pronoun emphasizes the fact that nobody helped me to sell myself.

Terminology 

Self-intensifiers have also been called simply "intensifiers", or "emphatic reflexives", or "intensive reflexives". In many languages, they are similar or identical to reflexive pronouns.

In other languages 

Latin has a dedicated intensifier, ipse, -a, -um, used to emphasize a noun or pronoun in either a subject or a predicate of a sentence.

In Danish, emphasis is indicated using the word selv; "I will do it myself" is rendered Jeg gør det selv. When a verb is used that requires reflexion, it becomes similar to English except that two words are used: "I help myself" is rendered Jeg hjælper mig selv.

In German, emphasis is indicated using the word selbst. "I will do it myself" is rendered Ich werde es selbst tun. Dutch usage of zelf is identical: Ik zal het zelf doen.

In Spanish, as in most other pro-drop languages, emphasis can be added simply by explicitly using the omissible pronoun. Following the above example, "I will do it myself" is rendered "Lo haré yo." Adding "mismo" after the pronoun yields additional emphasis. French uses certain forms of disjunctive pronouns completed by adverb -même, for example (Je l'ai fait moi-même).

See also

 Disjunctive pronoun
 Weak pronoun
 Intensifier

References

Further reading

 Discusses how English came to acquire reflexive and intensive pronouns from earlier languages.
 Gast, Volker & Peter Siemund. 2006. Rethinking the relationship between SELF-intensifiers and reflexives. Linguistics 44(2). 343–381. .

Personal pronouns